Bellin may refer to:
Bellin Building in Wisconsin
Bellin Run, 10k race in Wisconsin
Billin, Syria
Kangirsuk, Quebec

People
Andy Bellin, American director and screenwriter
Christina Bellin (1937–1988), American model
Eirlys Bellin, Welsh actress
Howard Bellin, American author, inventor, and plastic surgeon
Jana Bellin (born 1947), British-Czechoslovak chess player
Jacques-Nicolas Bellin (1703–1772), French hydrographer and geographer
Melissa Bellin, also known as Spice; dancer, valet, and wrestler
Mildred Grosberg Bellin (1908–2008), American cookbook author
Robert Bellin (botn 1952), British chess master
Samuel Bellin (1799-1893), English printmaker and engraver

See also
Belin (disambiguation)